Robert Machray (17 May 1831 – 9 March 1904) was an Anglican bishop and missionary and the first Primate of the Church of England in Canada (now called the Anglican Church of Canada).

Life
He was born in Aberdeen, Scotland.
He was the son of Robert Machray, and wife Christian Macallum.

Machray was educated at King's College, University of Aberdeen and Sidney Sussex College, Cambridge, where he studied mathematics, philosophy and theology.

He was ordained in the Church of England in 1855 and served parishes in that country, as well as serving as dean of his alma mater at Cambridge. 
In 1865, he became Bishop of Rupert's Land (in Canada), becoming archbishop of the province when his diocese was split in 1875. 
At the first General Synod of Canadian Anglicans in 1893 he was unanimously elected as the first Primate of All Canada, serving in the position until his death.  
In 1893, he was appointed a Prelate of the Order of St Michael and St George.
On 9 March 1904, he died unmarried at Winnipeg.

He is honoured in the Calendar of Saints of the Anglican Church of Canada with a feast day on 10 March.

Notes

References

External links

Historical resources on Robert Machray
The Legacy of Archbishop Robert Machray First Primate of All Canada
Manitoba Historical Society

1831 births
1904 deaths
Anglican bishops of Rupert's Land
19th-century Anglican archbishops
20th-century Anglican archbishops
Scottish Episcopalian priests
19th-century Anglican Church of Canada bishops
Alumni of Sidney Sussex College, Cambridge
Primates of the Anglican Church of Canada
Alumni of the University of Aberdeen
Anglican saints
Metropolitans of Rupert's Land
Anglican missionaries in Canada
Scottish Anglican missionaries